Dongincheon Station is a railway station on Seoul Metropolitan Subway Line 1 and Gyeongin Line located in Inhyeon-dong, Jung-gu, Incheon. Upon its opening in 1899, the station was known as "Chukhyeon Station", and in 1955, received its current name (literally East Incheon). The subway service started in 1974.

History
 September 18, 1899: Began operations as Chuckhyeon Station.
 April 25, 1926: Name changed to Sangincheon Station.
 August 7, 1955: Name changed to Dongincheon Station.
 August 15, 1974: Opened for Seoul Metropolitan Subway

References

Metro stations in Incheon
Seoul Metropolitan Subway stations
Railway stations opened in 1899
Jung District, Incheon